Vejle is a city in Denmark, in the southeast of the Jutland Peninsula at the head of Vejle Fjord, where the Vejle River and Grejs River and their valleys converge.  It is the site of the councils of Vejle Municipality (kommune) and the Region of Southern Denmark. The city has a population of 60,231 making it the ninth largest city in Denmark. Vejle Municipality has a population of 119,007 making it the fifth largest municipality in Denmark. The city is part of the Triangle Region, which includes the neighbouring cities of Kolding and Fredericia and it is located 110 kilometres (68 miles) north of Germany.

Vejle is most known for its forested hills, fjord, harbour, shopping, pedestrian mall, and windmill.

History

The word "Vejle" derives from the Old Danish word wæthel, meaning "ford" or "wading place" due to its location at a busy crossing over Vejle River.  During Viking times, the wetlands around Vejle had to be crossed at the Ravning Bridge, a nearly half-mile wooden boardwalk.  The first recorded mention of the town is from 1256, and the first known merchant town privileges were issued by King Valdemar III in 1327.

Archaeological digs near St. Nicolai Church in downtown Vejle have shown that there were residences in the area as far back as 1100. The king's castle, Castrum Wæthel, was located where Vejle Trafikcenter is today.

During the Middle Ages, Vejle was important as a market town, and developed along those lines up to the mid-17th century, trading with cities such as Lübeck and Flensburg, in what is now Germany.

In the late 17th and early 18th centuries, Vejle's population was diminished as a consequence of plague and war. In 1796, though, Vejle was made the seat of the newly founded Vejle County, and the town expanded throughout the 19th century, benefiting from improvements such as a new harbour on the fjord, a railroad station, and modern utilities.

From the mid-19th century into the 20th century, Vejle developed from a provincial market town into a busy industrial centre, eventually becoming known as the "Manchester of Denmark" for its many cotton mills.

Geography

Downtown Vejle was built on an island of glacial till in Vejle River remaining from a hill formed during the last ice age.

In a country where the highest natural elevation is only about 170 m (558 ft) above sea level, Vejle is known for the forested hills that rise to the north and south of the town and fjord.

The valleys of the two rivers that converge at Vejle are both unique in Denmark: Vejle River Valley (Vejle Ådal) is the longest tunnel valley in Denmark, and the Grejs Valley (Grejsdalen) is the largest ravine in Denmark.

Both empty into Vejle Fjord, which connects Vejle by water through the Little Belt strait to the Baltic Sea, and through the Kattegat and Skagerrak straits to the Atlantic Ocean.

Neighbourhoods

Many of Vejle's neighbourhoods began as separate towns or villages that merged with the city as it grew.  Søndermarken, Nørremarken, and Grejsdalen, however, were all founded as extensions of the city onto the surrounding hillsides.

Vejle's neighbourhoods include:
Vejle centre
Bredballe - east of downtown and north of Vejle Fjord; considered an affluent neighbourhood
Grejsdalen - northernmost part of the city, located in the long, narrow valley of the same name
Hover - west of Grejsdalen, closer to the centre
Lille Grundet - north of downtown in the northwest corner of Nørremarken, relatively new
Store Grundet - established in 2000, north of Lille Grundet
Mølholm - southeast of the centre
Nørremarken - northeast of the centre, including the North Woods (Nørreskoven) and Vejle Stadium
Petersminde - on top of Uhrhøj, west of Grejsdalen
Vestbyen (West Town) - western Vejle, including Skibet and Trædballe, and the scenic overlook of Himmelpind
Vinding - southeast, next to Mølholm
Søndermarken - to the southwest, located on land belonging to the former Petersholm manor

Economy
Vejle is the cultural and economic centre of Vejle Municipality and, as part of the unofficial Triangle Area (Trekantområde), is rich in industry, business, and the service sector. Historically speaking, industry has been very important for the city's development, while today more weight is placed on business and service, as well as high-tech firms.

Industry

During the Industrial Revolution, Vejle was known as the "Manchester of Denmark" due to its extensive textile mills.  The local rivers provided water power to mills, including the extensive facilities of De Danske Bomuldsspinderier (The Danish Cotton Mills).  In the first half of the 20th century, Vejle was something of a behemoth within the Danish textile industry, with some 25% of the city's workers employed in the industry.
Despite the decline in the industry in Denmark, the last cotton mill in Vejle remained open until 1993.  Today, many of the old mill buildings are used for art studios, office space, and, more recently, apartments.

Later on, newer industries took root in Vejle.  The city is home to one of the largest chewing gum factories in the world, producing Stimorol brand chewing gum.

The Tulip slaughterhouses were also an important employer in the city.  Today, Tulip has closed its factory at the harbour, but still maintains production in northern Vejle.

Today, Vejle's economy is shifting out of the industrial sector and into the high-tech sector, with a number of software companies operating out of the city.

Shopping

Vejle is known regionally as a vibrant shopping town with a wide and varied offering of both chain and specialty shops, primarily located along the city's central pedestrian mall.  Recently, in an effort to maintain its position as a premiere shopping destination, the town has invested in several public works projects to improve the city's appearance, including lengthening the pedestrian mall, developing new public art and architecture, and uncovering and beautifying Grejs River, which until recently ran in a culvert underneath downtown.

In addition to the shopping experiences in the city, Vejle also has its own shopping centre, Bryggen, located in the center of the city. The shopping centre contains 38 stores and two restaurants and lies within the pedestrian mall.

Street food concepts can also be experience at the Paladspassagen Social Dining at the former Mary's Shoppingcenter.

Politics

Ever since Social Democrat Christian Jacobsen became Vejle's first elected mayor in 1919, the town has been a stronghold for the Social Democrats and trade unions.  The longest serving Social Democratic mayor was Willy Sørensen, a union leader who joined the city council in 1937 and held the mayor's post for 31 years, from 1946 until his death in 1978.

In 1993, the Social Democratic dynasty was broken, when a candidate from a coalition of opposition parties, Flemming Christiansen, became mayor.  In 2009, the Social Democrats were out of power again when Liberal candidate Arne Sigtenbjerggaard won the elections.

Several natives of Vejle have also made a career in national politics, including former Prime Minister Lars Løkke Rasmussen (Liberal), the former Minister of the Treasury Troels Lund Poulsen (Liberal), former Minister of Health Torben Lund (Social Democrat), and former Minister of Transportation Flemming Hansen (Conservative).

Infrastructure

Historically speaking, Vejle's development has been guided by the city's central location in the country and its location on Vejle Fjord.  Vejle's pedestrian mall today runs along the same course as some of the earliest paths through town – glass panels set into Torvegade allow pedestrians to see the historical market road a few meters under the current street surface.

Highway E45 passes close to downtown Vejle on the Vejle Fjord Bridge. Vejle is also located on Primary Route 28, and the Mid-Jutland Highway (Midjyske Motorvej, Primary Route 18) from Herning.

Vejle station, also known as Vejle Transit Centre (Vejle Trafikcenter), provides nine city bus lines to various neighbourhoods, as well as national and international coach and train services.  Vejle Station first opened in 1868, and is today a central station in the Danish train network.  However, the station is currently the subject of political debate, due to a desire on the part of some politicians to reduce train travel time between Odense and Århus to one hour.  This may mean that a second bridge will be built over Vejle Fjord, bypassing Vejle Station.

Vejle Harbour, in its current location, was inaugurated in 1827. In the years following World War II, it grew to become the second largest port in Denmark after the Port of Copenhagen. Up until 1932, the steamboats Hvidbjerg (named after a local seaside community) and Jeppe Jensen (named after the harbour's founder) plied the waters between Vejle Harbour and Munkebjerg, Tirsbæk, Ulbækhus, and Fakkegrav. The harbour is currently profitable, although there are plans to convert the northern section of the harbour into a park and residential area, which would reconnect the town with the fjord.  The fjord is also the site of the modern wave-shaped apartment complex known as The Wave (Bølgen).

Airport buses run regularly to Billund Airport from Vejle Transit Centre.

Environment

A central point of Vejle's environmental policy since 1985 has been the sorting of garbage into non-compostable and compostable waste, which is then composted in the city dump.  To this end, residents must place all household trash into either black or green bags.

Vejle Municipality has also begun a range of nature restoration projects.  The most ambitious of these has been the restoration of the Kongens Kær wetlands around the Vejle River just outside the city limits.  The city has also undertaken a project to establish two new public beaches for swimming, Albuen and Tirsbæk Strand.

Education

Vejle is home to the headquarters of University College Lillebælt, which is a merger of several educational institutions in East Jutland and Funen.

Adult and professional education is available in Vejle through the Region of Southern Denmark, the Folkeuniversitet (Adult Education Centre), the Vejle Idrætshøjskole (Athletics Professional College), and Skolen for Gastronomi, Musik & Design (School for Gastronomy, Music, and Design).

On the secondary education level, Vejle offers several options: Vejle Handelsskole (Vejle Business School) offers business and professional programs; Vejle Tekniske Gymnasium (Vejle Technical School) offers vocational and technical education; and Rødkilde Gymnasium (on the fjord) and Rosborg Gymnasium offer academic programs with concentrations in language and science.

On the primary level, Vejle has 11 regular primary schools (folkeskoler), 2 independent schools (friskoler), and 5 private schools (privatskoler) – one secular, one Protestant, one Catholic, one Islamic and one Waldorf-Steiner method school – as well as 2 schools for special needs students.  Unique to Vejle is a special program for athletically talented students starting in late primary school and continuing through Vejle Handelsskole.

Sports

The city's traditional football club, Vejle Boldklub (Vejle Football Club), has won the Danish Superliga Championships five times and the Danish Cup six times. Vejle Boldklub has trained many talented football players, among others one of Danish football history's few international stars: Allan Simonsen, who in 1977 became the first Danish player to win the European Footballer of the Year award. Today, Vejle Boldklub is in a ramping-up period, with the goal of bringing the club back to the top of Danish football. To this end, new Vejle Stadium was opened in spring 2008.

Vejle's largest indoor sports facilities are mostly housed in the DGI-Huset recreational centre in western Vejle.  In the past, the facility has housed several high-profile events, including the European Women's Handball Championship and the Danish Open in badminton.

Former Swiss cyclist Tony Rominger was born in Vejle, and cyclist Bjarne Riis has a house in Vejle. Denmark's answer to the Tour de France, Danmark Rundt, includes a stretch through Vejle which is known as the hardest stage in the race, including a loop that requires the riders to climb the hillsides of Vejle several times. The race's winner is usually determined in the Vejle stage. Stage 3 of the 2022 Tour de France started in Vejle.

Arts and attractions

In the arts, the most well-known personality from Vejle is composer Jacob Gade, who wrote the Tango Jalousie.  Other artists include author Ulrik Gräs, priest and historial Anders Sørensen Vedel, author Karl Bjarnhof, poet Inger Christensen, artist Albert Bertelsen, and actress Bodil Jørgensen.

In the early and mid-20th century, Vejle had several popular cultural destinations such as Trædballehus in the western part of town and the Munkebjerg Casino south of the fjord.

Trædballehus, an inn and music venue, which burned down in 1954, got its big breakthrough in the mid-1930s when it was featured on Danish National Radio in connection with the opening of the old Little Belt Bridge. 1933 Hotel Munkebjerg boasted Europe's longest wooden escalator, carrying guests from the fjord-side beach up to the hilltop casino. Munkebjerg still exists as a hotel, casino and conference centre.

Vejle Mill, located on top of the cliff at Søndermarken, is a well-known landmark because of its visibility, and is often used as a symbol of the city.

The Old Jail House in Vejle, which is connected to the Town Hall, was rebuilt in 1984 and received a prize for beautification.

Development of new architecture, art and alternative town spaces throughout the 1990s has made the city an attraction. Vejle was the first city in Denmark, which had its own official architecture policy to set high standards for the urban development.

Vejle's oldest extant building, St. Nicolai Church, was built in the mid-13th century.  On display in the church is the Haraldskær bog woman, a body from the Iron Age that was preserved with its skin intact in a local peat bog.  Another feature of the church are 23 spherical indentations on the north transept – legend says these are imprints of the skulls of executed robbers from the woods that surround Vejle.

Among the city's cultural institutions is the renovated and expanded Vejle Museum of Art. The museum features the Wörzner collection with several COBRA works as well as works by Rembrandt. Today, Vejle Town Museum is located in the renovated Spinning Mill.

The Socialists' former stronghold in Vejle, The Building, is today placed under glass in a new shopping center, Mary's, and houses restaurants, cafés and two venues for e.g. jazz concerts. Økolariet is a free edutainment center for both children and adults, focusing on technology, ecology, recycling, etc.

Vejle is situated close to several Jutland attractions such as the original Legoland and the Viking Age royal capital of Jelling.  Jelling's archaeological artifacts are considered a UNESCO World Heritage Site, and include two 10th century rune stones and two burial mounds, as well as a new exhibition centre.

Notable people

Public Service & public thinking 
 Ludvig Munk (1537 in Vejle - 1602) a Junker at the royal court in 1561 and a Count
 Anders Sørensen Vedel (1542 in Vejle – 1616), priest and historian, translator of Gesta Danorum
 Johann Andreas Mühlensteth (1746 in Vejle - 1819) a pharmacist who experimented with hot air balloons
 Poul Martin Møller (1794 in Uldum near Vejle – 1838) a Danish academic, writer, and poet
 Jens Jacob Asmussen Worsaae (1821 in Vejle – 1885), archeologist and the 2nd director National Museum of Denmark 
 Nicholas Bjerring (1831 in Vejle - 1900) the first Orthodox Christian priest to establish an Orthodox church and community in the northeastern United States
 Holger Petersen (1843 in Vejle - 1917) a Danish textile manufacturer and philanthropist. 
 Lili Elbe (1882 in Vejle - 1931) transgender woman, early recipient of sex reassignment surgery
 Thorkil Kristensen (1899 in Fløjstrup near Vejle – 1989) politician, finance minister and futurist
 Niels Åge Nielsen (1913 in Vejle - 1986) professor of Nordic languages and leader in the Danish resistance movement
 Torben Lund (born 1950 in Vejle) retired politician, MEP 1999-2004
 Fritz Schur (born 1951 in Vejle) a Danish businessman with connections
 Lars-Henrik Schmidt (born 1953 in Vejle) a philosopher, developed Social Analytics
 Lene Hau (born 1959 in Vejle) a Danish physicist in Boston USA
 Lars Løkke Rasmussen (born 1964 in Vejle) 25th Prime Minister of Denmark 2009/2011 and 2015/2019

The Arts 

 Sophus Juncker-Jensen (1859 in Vejle – 1940) an early Danish photographer
 Harald Kidde (1878 in Vejle– 1918) a Danish writer, wrote the novel Helten (The Hero)
 Jacob Gade (1879 in Vejle – 1963) violinist and composer of Jalousie
 Lili Elbe (1882 in Vejle – 1931) Painter.
 Lau Lauritzen Jr. (1910 in Vejle – 1977) a Danish actor, screenwriter and film director
 Lilly Brændgaard (1918 in Vejle – 2009) a fashion designer, opened a studio in Vejle in 1947
 Albert Bertelsen (1921 in Vejle – 2019) a Danish autodidact painter and graphic artist
 Inger Christensen (1935 in Vejle – 2009) a poetic experimentalist, novelist, essayist and editor
 Kirsten Dehlholm (born 1945 in Vejle) a Danish artist and artistic theatre director
 Bodil Jørgensen (born 1961 in Vejle) a Danish film actress
 Nicolai Kielstrup (born 1991 in Vejle) a Danish singer
 Lilian Weber Hansen (1911–1987), opera singer

Sport 

 Bent Sørensen (1926 in Vejle – 2011) a footballer for Vejle Boldklub, 157 goals in 200 matches
 Poul Mejer (1931 in Vejle – 2000) a footballer for Vejle Boldklub, 307 club caps
 Johnny Hansen (born 1943 in Vejle) a former footballer, 433 club caps and 45 for Denmark
 Ulrik le Fevre (born 1946 in Vejle) former footballer, over 400 club caps and 37 for Denmark
 Allan Simonsen (born 1952 in Vejle) a former footballer and manager, 500 club caps and 55 for Denmark
 Ole Mortensen (born 1958 in Vejle) a Danish first-class cricketer
 John Sivebæk (born 1961 in Vejle) a former footballer, over 600 club caps, 300 for Vejle Boldklub and 87 for Denmark
 Tony Rominger (born 1961 in Vejle) a Swiss former professional road racing cyclist
 Brian Steen Nielsen (born 1968 in Vejle) footballer, 440 club caps and 66 matches for Denmark
 Jacob Laursen (born 1971 in Vejle) retired footballer, 439 club caps and 25 for Denmark
 Todi Jónsson (born 1972 in Vejle) a retired Faroese footballer, 338 club caps and 45 for the Faroes
 Thomas Gravesen (born 1976 in Vejle) a former footballer, 314 club caps and 66 for Denmark
 Jacob Barsøe (born 1988 in Vejle) rower, bronze and silver medallist at the 2012 and 2016 Summer Olympics
 Peter Lang (born 1989 in Vejle) a sailor, team bronze medallist at the 2012 Summer Olympics
 Daniel Jørgensen (born 1993 in Vejle) a Danish Paralympic sportsman and Olympic medallist
 Nicolai Reedtz (born 1995 in Vejle), a Danish successful Counter-Strike esports player
 Frederik Vesti (born 2002 in Vejle), a Danish racing driver
 Mikkel Grundtvig (born 2002 in Veijle), a Danish racing driver

Twin towns – sister cities

Vejle is twinned with:
 Borås, Sweden
 Jelgava, Latvia
 Mikkeli, Finland
 Molde, Norway
 Schleswig, Germany

Vejle also cooperates with:
 Jablanica, Bosnia and Herzegovina
 Mostar, Bosnia and Herzegovina
 Nantong, China

Notes

Also referenced
Asbjørn Hellum. "History of Vejle". Vejle Byhistoriske Arkiv & Stadsarkiv. Retrieved 31 March 2005. (In English)
C.M.Hogan, History of Sct. Nicolai Kirche, Vejle, Denmark, Lumina Technologies, Santa Rosa Ca. July 23, 2006 (in English)

External links
 
 
Vejle municipality (In Danish)
Vejle Kommuneatlas (Municipal Atlas) (In Danish)
Vejle-Egnens Touristbureau (Vejle Area Tourist Bureau) (In English)
Vejle Byhistoriske Arkiv & Stadsarkiv (City Historical Archive) (In Danish, some English)
Vejle Amts Folkeblad (regional newspaper) (In Danish)
Vejle Idrætshøjskole (In Danish)

 
Municipal seats of the Region of Southern Denmark
Municipal seats of Denmark
Cities and towns in the Region of Southern Denmark
Vejle Municipality